Ivar Antonsen (born April 16, 1946, in Fauske, Norway) is a Norwegian jazz pianist and composer and had his debut at the Oslo jazz scene in 1967 together with Jan Garbarek, Palle Mikkelborg, Arild Andersen, and Espen Rud.

Career 
Antonsen started early playing the accordion and organ, inspired by jazz musician Art van Damme. 18-year-old he came in touch with bassist Bjørn Alterhaug, and they started their first jazz band together in Mo i Rana. He moved to Oslo and studied modern composition at Norges Musikkhøgskole under Finn Mortensen and came in contact with major jazz profiles. All along he was inspired, both as jazz musician and composer, by the piano music of Johann Sebastian Bach and Igor Stravinskij.

In the late 1960s he started his own Ivar Antonsen Trio including Espen Rud (drums) and alternately Terje Venaas, Sture Janson and Bjørn Alterhaug on bass. His strong contribution to guitarist Thorgeir Stubø's album Flight (1985) can be cited as a good example of Antonsen's sophisticated style. Here you can enjoy the hard swinging interaction with Thorgeir Stubø, Alex Riel (drums), Krister Andersson (tenor saxophone) and Jesper Lundgaard (double bass).

Antonsen was principal of the "Tromsø Musikkskole" (1975–1977), and later, "Buskerud Musikkonservatorium". Then he relocated to San Diego in US (1985), where he was a music educator and later professor in Music at California State University (1995–2004). Since 2004 he has been Associate Professor at Norges Musikkhøgskole. With residence in San Diego for 19 years, Antonsen had many interesting collaborations, including with Ravi Shankar's tabla player Abhiman Kaushal, drummer Duncan Moore, guitarist Peter Sprague, bassist Bob Magnusson and pianist Andy LaVerne on the album Dream Come True (2000).

Antonsen's compositions often consist of strong rhythmic patterns, harmonically sophisticated and melodically complex, yet logical. His works include modern jazz, and contemporary classical music. He is highly respected among both European and American musicians and has played with jazz greats such as Jon Christensen, Palle Danielsson, John Surman, Arild Andersen, Ben Webster, Jimmy Heath, Slide Hampton, Art Farmer, and Karin Krog. He established his own quartet in 2004 with Espen Rud, Knut Riisnæs and Terje Gewelt, documented as an EBU radio concert on NRK P2 "Jazzklubben" in 2006 and he subsequently appeared in many other quartets with saxophone players like Frode Nymo, Atle Nymo, and Morten Halle as well as with guitarist Hallgeir Pedersen.

Antonsen is considered one of Norway's foremost jazz pianists, and plays in a modern neo-bop style. His playing has a strong identity and is characterized by a sensitive approach, great imagination, complex harmony/rhythm and technical facility.

Discography 
An asterisk (*) indicates that the year is that of release.

As leader/co-leader

As sideman 
1985: Flight (Hot Club Records), live recording with Thorgeir Stubø 
2010: Flight Dec. 17 (Ponca Jazz Records/Musikkoperatørene) with Hallgeir Pedersen, Bjørn Alterhaug, Roger Johansen
2011: Dobbeldans (Curling Legs) with Espen Rud Group

See also 

 List of jazz pianists

References

External links 
Ivar Antonsen on Ponca Jazz Records

20th-century Norwegian pianists
21st-century Norwegian pianists
Norwegian jazz pianists
Norwegian jazz composers
Taurus Records artists
Musicians from Fauske
Living people
1946 births